Zeil um Zehn was a political talk show of the Hessischer Rundfunk, which was broadcast from 1990 to 1993 on Friday evenings on hessen 3.

Overview
The weekly talk show was broadcast from the Arabella-Grandhotel in Frankfurt am Main in the immediate vicinity of the name-giving Zeil with guests from politics and entertainment for the first time on 19 January 1990 with the presenter Beate Wedekind. Other moderators were Alice Schwarzer, Wolfgang Korruhn and Beatrix Millies.

Presenters
Wolfgang Korruhn
Beatrix Millies
Alice Schwarzer
Beate Wedekind

References

External links

1990 German television series debuts
1993 German television series endings
1990 establishments in West Germany
1993 disestablishments in Germany
Hessischer Rundfunk
German-language television shows